Afanasii Ivanovich Seredin-Sabatin (Афанасий Иванович Середин-Сабатин) was a Russian steersman-pilot and reporter for an English newspaper, but is best known as the first European (Russian) architect to live and work in the Korean Empire from (approximately) 1890 to 1904.  He built a number of palaces in European style within the city of Seoul.  He also built the first Russian Legation building, also in the city of Seoul.  This building is a historical site because shortly after the Japanese invasion of Korea, in 1895, when the Korean Queen Min was assassinated by the Japanese, King Gojong and his son were given refuge in the Russian Legation for a year.

Biography

Ancestry

Afanasii’s father:  Ivan Vassilievich Seredin-Sabatin. 
Was of noble birth, landed gentry, of the province of Poltava, Ukraine, where the family owned an estate, with serfs.  They lived in the town of Lubny, in the same province, where they also owned properties.

Afanasii’s mother: (name unknown)
Ivan Vassilisvich’s first wife (Afanasii’s mother) was a Ukrainian commoner, descended from Zaporozhian Cossacks  (on the Dnieper River, Ukraine).

Summarized Biography

Afanasii Ivanovich Seredin-Sabatin, was born in Lubny, Poltava, Ukraine, in 1860.  While he was still very young his father remarried.  His stepmother was cruel towards him, thus, at the age of 14 he went to live with his uncle in Petrograd.

Afanasii attended the Petrograd Academy of Arts for a year.  He also attended an architectural university (it is unknown which one).  However, just before graduating he apparently had a falling out with a professor and left the university without graduating.  With no certificate of graduation he was unable to find work as an architect.  Later he entered a Sea Cadet Corps school. Upon graduation he became steersman-pilot of a Russian vessel in the Far East. It was there that he met his future wife.

Lydia Christianovna Shalich, was of Polish-German origin, born in Galicia, Russian Empire.  She had a very good contralto voice, often singing in concerts.  She was also a good swimmer and hiker.  Lydia educated their four children.  Lydia died in 1936, at the age of 69, in Shanghai, China.

Afanasii spent sometime at sea in the Far East until arriving in Korea in 1883 where he was hired by Paul Georg von Möllendorff for geodesic  and construction works. Once in Korea Afanasii learned that the Korean King was seeking a European architect to build a number of buildings on palace grounds.  Apparently King was interested in western culture, and it did not seem to matter to King that Afanasii did not have a degree in architecture.  So at the age of 24 Afanasii left the sea and lived and worked in Korea, where he built a number of buildings of note, a number of which are still standing.  He also left historical marks in other ways—namely as an eyewitness to the assassination of Queen Min by the Japanese.

Later, and while still in the Far East, Afanasii mastered the English language and worked for a while as reporter for an English newspaper.  Afanasii also built several summer homes at Peitaho, China, and other countries.

Soon after the Russo-Japanese war (1904–05) he suffered some kind of a nervous disorder and left his family consisting of his wife, four daughters and one son.  Afanasii went at first to Vladivostok, Siberia, then to European Russia where he died in 1921.  The place of his death is uncertain.  It was either at Rostov-on-the-Don, or Volgograd (former Tsaritsin) on the Volga.

Afanasii loved hunting with his 10 caliber double-barreled shotgun.  He was an excellent swimmer (having saved several people from drowning), an accomplished tennis player, and an indefatigable hiker.  He was irresponsible, and despite his many talents, the family very often found themselves in dire financial straits.

Achievements in Korea

According to curator at Cultural Heritage Administration (CHA) of South Korea, only two buildings in Korea can be confirmed as achievement of Afanasy Seredin-Sabatin.

 A building in the north of Gyeongbok Palace (경복궁) called Gwanmungak (관문각). It was a 3-story western building that has since been destroyed.
 Former Russia legation building, which is one of Historic Sites of South Korea designated in 22, November 1977.

Eyewitness to the assassination of Queen Min (Empress Myeongseong)

September 25, 1895 (Its Russian old calendar = 8 Oct 1895) 
 
On 8 October 1895, Empress Myeongseong (referred to as "Queen Min") was assassinated by Japanese agents. It was the Japanese minister to Korea, Miura Goro that had orchestrated the plot against her. In 2001, Russian reports on the assassin were found in the archives of the Foreign Ministry of the Russian Federation. The documents included the testimony of King Gojong, several witnesses of the assassination, and Karl Ivanovich Weber's report to Lobanov-Rostovsky, the Foreign Minister of Russia. Weber was the chargé d'affaires at the Russian legation in Seoul at that time. According to a Russian eyewitness, Seredin-Sabatin (an employee of the Korean king, a group of Japanese agents and members of the Hullyeondae army entered the royal palace, killed Empress Myeongseong, and desecrated her body in the north wing of the palace. She was forty-three years old at the time of her assassination.

Reacting to the murder, father of King's Daewongun returned to the royal palace on the same day. On 11 February 1896, King Gojong and his crown prince moved from the Gyeongbokgung palace to the Russian legation in Seoul, from which they governed for about one year, an event known as Korea royal refuge at the Russian legation.

See also
 Russians in Korea
 Korea under Japanese rule
 Empress Myeongseong

References

External links
English translation of Seridin-Sabatin's testimony of Queen Min assassination

1860 births
1921 deaths
1896 in Korea
People from Lubny
Russian architects
Russian journalists
Russian sailors
Naval Cadet Corps alumni